Anzor is a Circassian, Chechen and Georgian masculine given name. The name possibly derived from the Georgian noble title აზნაური (aznauri), ultimately from Middle Persian aznawar meaning "noble". Alternatively or independently, the name could be derived from Arabic أَنْذَرَ (ʾanḏara) meaning "preventive" or "warn, notify, caution". 

People with the name include:

 Anzor Ashev (born 1998), Russian footballer
 Anzor Astemirov (1976–2010), Islamist leader of a terrorist group in the Russian republic of Kabardino-Balkaria
 Anzor Boltukayev (born 1986), Russian freestyle wrestler of Chechen descent
 Anzor Chikhladze (born 1949), Russian footballer
 Anzor Daurbekov (born 1977), Russian footballer
 Anzor Dzamikhov (born 1975), Russian football player and coach
 Anzor Gubashev, a suspect in the assassination of Boris Nemtsov
 Anzor Kavazashvili (born 1940), Soviet former football goalkeeper of Georgian nationality
 Anzor Khizriev (born 1990), Russian freestyle wrestler of Chechen descent
 Anzor Kiknadze (1934–1977), Georgian judoka
 Anzor Koblev (born 1966), Russian football player and coach
 Anzor Kunizhev (born 1975), Russian footballer
 Anzor Nafash (born 1978), Russian footballer
 Anzor Sanaya (born 1989), Russian footballer
 Anzor Sitchinava (born 1995), Georgian rugby union player
 Anzor Tembulatov (born 1989), Russian footballer
 Anzor Urdia (born 1939), Georgian actor
 Anzor Urishev (born 1987), Kabardin-Russian wrestler